The Downtown LaBelle Historic District is a U.S. historic district (designated as such on March 25, 1999) located in LaBelle, Florida. The district is on the 300 Block of North Bridge Street. It contains 9 historic buildings.

References

External links

 Hendry County listings at National Register of Historic Places

Streamline Moderne architecture in the United States
Geography of Hendry County, Florida
Historic districts on the National Register of Historic Places in Florida
National Register of Historic Places in Hendry County, Florida